Wall crossing is a technique used by publicly traded companies to raise capital, typically from institutional investors in two stages. In a wall crossing, a publicly listed company tries to raise capital through large stock sales by having institutional investors pre-arranged to buy substantial blocks of newly issued stock ahead of a public announcement of the offering as part of a confidential offering. In order to participate in what is essentially a private placement, investors typically sign a non-disclosure agreement that allows them to "cross the wall", thus becoming insiders and gaining access to material non-public information.

References 

Investment